The South Fork Merced River is the largest tributary of the Merced River. Most of the river flows within Yosemite National Park in the Sierra Nevada of California.

This canyon comes to an end at a large bowl-shaped valley where the river passes the north side of Wawona and receives Chilnualna Creek from the right. After passing under Wawona Road (the south entrance road to the national park) the river drops into another broader, deeper gorge running north, receiving Alder, Rail, Big, and Bishop Creeks, all from the right.

The river was mislabelled "Illilouette Creek" on 1871 California Geological Survey reports. Illilouette Creek is actually another tributary of the Merced River further to the east.

References

Rivers of Mariposa County, California
Rivers of the Sierra Nevada (United States)
Rivers of Yosemite National Park
Sierra National Forest
Rivers of Northern California
Rivers of the Sierra Nevada in California
Wild and Scenic Rivers of the United States